Francesco Colonna (1433/1434 – 1527) was an Italian Dominican priest and monk who was credited with the authorship of the Hypnerotomachia Poliphili by an acrostic formed by initial letters of the text.

He lived in Venice, and preached at St. Mark's Cathedral.  Besides Hypnerotomachia Poliphili, he definitely wrote a Latin epic poem, Delfili Somnium (the "Dream of Delfilo"), which went unpublished in his lifetime and was not published until 1959. Colonna spent part of his life in the monastery of San Giovanni e Paolo in Venice, but the monastery was apparently not of the strictest observance and Colonna was granted leave to live outside its walls.
In Ian Caldwell's and Dustin Thomason's novel The Rule of Four, the Roman noble of the same name, Francesco Colonna, is featured as the true author of the Hypnerotomachia Poliphili.

References

External links 

 
 
 Colonna, Francesco, Hypnerotomachia: The Strife of Love in a Dreame, Translation by R.D., London, 1592. Facsimile ed., introd. by Lucy Gent, 1973, Scholars' Facsimiles & Reprints, .
 Hypnerotomachia Poliphili, at MIT Press
 Hypnerotomachia Poliphili, at Rare Book Room

Italian Renaissance writers
15th-century Venetian writers
1430s births
1527 deaths
Italian Dominicans
16th-century Venetian writers
16th-century male writers